Irina Sabine Alice Karamanos Adrian (born 29 October 1989) is a Chilean anthropologist and political scientist. She is the domestic partner of Gabriel Boric, who was inaugurated as President of Chile on 11 March 2022. As a result, she assumed the roles of First Lady of Chile and Director of the Sociocultural Area of the Presidency.

Politics 
Karamanos is an influential figure in her political party, Social Convergence, where she leads the Feminist Front. Initially, both she and Boric opposed the existence of the First Lady role, with Karamanos stating that it needed to be rethought to reflect the changing times and power dynamics. However, after reflecting on the decision for several weeks, Karamanos decided to take on the role and reform it. She has expressed her intention to focus on issues related to transgender rights and child migration. The decision to assume the role and preserve its existence was met with both support and pushback from various feminist groups in Chile.

Personal life 
Karamanos was born to schoolteacher Jorge Karamanos Eleftheriu, who was a Greek community leader in Santiago, Chile during the 1980s. Her mother, Sabine Adrian Gierke, is a German-to-Spanish translator born in Uruguay. Her paternal grandparents were born in Kymi, Greece and her maternal grandparents were born in Germany. She is fluent in Spanish, Greek, English and German.

References 

1989 births
Living people
Chilean people of Greek descent
Chilean people of German descent
Chilean people of Uruguayan descent
Chilean women anthropologists
First ladies of Chile
Social Convergence politicians
Members of the Autonomist Movement
University of Chile alumni
Heidelberg University alumni
21st-century Chilean women politicians
21st-century Chilean politicians